Stefan Niederseer (born 29 September 1962 in Saalbach-Hinterglemm) is a former Austrian alpine skier. He won the Men's Downhill at the 1985 Austrian Alpine Ski Championships.

External links

1962 births
Living people
Austrian male alpine skiers
People from Zell am See District
Sportspeople from Salzburg (state)
20th-century Austrian people